Edgard Villavicencio Peregrina (November 11, 1944 – April 30, 1977), better known as Eddie Peregrina, was a Filipino singer and matinee idol of the 1970s. Dubbed as "The Original Jukebox King", he was most famous for hit songs such as "What Am I Living For", "Together Again", "Two Lovely Flowers" and "Mardy", among others. He died at the peak of his popularity at the age of 32, one month after a car accident on EDSA in Mandaluyong.

Biography 
He was born as Edgard Villavicencio Peregrina on November 11, 1944 to Octavio Peregrina of Pililla, Rizal and Nena Villavicencio of Cebu. Eddie started singing in amateur contests as a young child. He won the singing contest of DZXL's "Tita Betty's Children Show" at the age of six. After he graduated at Villamor High School in 1963, he became a professional singer, working as a vocalist for some bands, most notably the Blinkers Band in Japan. His biggest break came when he won the singing contest of Tawag ng Tanghalan, a popular TV variety show of the 60s and 70s.

Singing style 
Peregrina's unusually high-pitched voice distinguished him from the rest of popular singers who, at the time, were mostly influenced by the low-pitched, smooth voices of international singers like Matt Monro and Frank Sinatra. He had a habit of tipping his feet backwards to hit the highest note.

Showbiz 
Peregrina's popularity was high, particularly among masses. Jukebox, the coin-operated machine which plays selected music, was said to have attained much popularity as well because of continuous requests of Peregrina's songs. His fame surge even more among the Filipino masses when he became movie star, cast with the leading ladies of the 1970s, including Esperanza Fabon, Vilma Santos and Nora Aunor, with whom he had a TV show entitled The Eddie-Nora Show on Channel 9 in the 1960s.
Among his movies included Mardy and Memories of Our Dreams with Esperanza Fabon. He co-starred with his wife Lyn Salazar in Batul of Mactan in 1974. He was also the leading man in Dito sa Aking Puso (1970) with Nora Aunor and with Vilma Santos in Mardy. Most of his films were produced by JBC Productions, which invariably paired him with Vilma Santos, Edgar Mortiz, Esperanza Fabon, and directed by Consuelo P. Osorio. When not busy attending show business commitments, he managed his own business, including Edviper Records and the Pervil Photo Studio.

Personal life 
Peregrina was married to actress Lyn Salazar, with whom he had two daughters, Edlyn and Michelle. And had also a son named Raymund de Leon to his former manager.

Death 
Peregrina was involved in a car accident in 1977 when his Ford Mustang collided with a trailer truck on the EDSA-Shaw underpass. He died a month and a week later (April 30, 1977) at the age of 32 at Polymedic Hospital due to internal hemorrhage caused by the accident.

Filmography

Television
 1970 – The Nora-Eddie Show

Film
 1976 – Gold Cross
 1974 – Batul of Mactan
 1972 – I Do Love You
 1971 – Alaala ng Pag-ibig
 1971 – Luha sa Bawa't Awit
 1970 – Edong
 1970 – I Adore You
 1970 – Memories of Our Dream
 1970 – Songs and Lovers
 1970 – What Am I Living For
 1970 – Mardy
 1969 – Your Love
 1969 – Fiesta Extravaganza
 1969 – Halina Neneng Ko
 1969 – The Jukebox King
 1969 – Mardy
 1969 – My Darling Eddie
 1969 – Halina Neneng Ko

Discography

Albums

Studio albums
What Am I Living For (1968, D'Swan)
Encore (1968, D'Swan)
Christmas Greetings (1968, D'Swan)
Love Mood (1969, D'Swan)
Eddie Peregrina at His Best (1969, D'Swan)
Eddie (1969, D'Swan)
The Jukebox King (1969, D'Swan)
Lonely Boy (1970, D'Swan)
Old Time Favorites (1970, D'Swan)
Irog, Ako ay Mahalin (1976, Plaka Pilipino)
Our Wedding Song (with Lyn Salazar) (1976, Pioneer)
Especially for You (1976, Pioneer)

Compilation albums
Eddie Peregrina's Greatest Hits (1969, D'Swan)
Hanggang sa Dulo ng Walang Hanggan (1977, Plaka Pilipino)
Huling Paalam Ni Eddie Peregrina (1981, Valley Records)
 16 Golden Love Songs: I Can't Believe Vol. 1 (1994, Aquarius Records)
 Special Collector's Edition: Hanggang sa Dulo ng Walang Hanggan (1994, Vicor)
 Special Collector's Edition: What Am I Living For (1994, Vicor)
 Special Collector's Edition: Memories of Our Dreams (1994, Vicor)
 14 Golden Love Songs: Dearest Love/I Am Blue Vol. 2 (with Willy Rio and El Masculino) (1995, Aquarius Records)
 Special Collector's Edition: Send Someone to Love Me (2001, Vicor)
 Memories... (2005, Vicor)
 18 Greatest Hits: Eddie Peregrina Vol. 1 (2009, Vicor)
 18 Greatest Hits: Eddie Peregrina Vol. 2'' (2009, Vicor)

Songs
"Will You Still Love Me Tomorrow"
"Say Yeah, Say No"
"Hang On Sloopy (Jerk)"
"Blue Eyes"
"My Happiness"
"You Only Live Twice"
"Midnight Caravan"
"Bare Footin'"
"Top Twenty"
"Dark Side of Love"
"I Need Somebody"
"Girl"
"Kokotsu No Blues (I Feel Blue)"
"Itsumademo (Forever)"
"Our Love Was Born"
"No More Tears to Fall"
"I'm Gonna Find Myself a Girl"
"Matador"
"Only Yesterday"
"Mony Mony"
"Get On Up"
"We"
"Legata ad un Granello"
"Need You"
"Don't Say Goodbye"
"Please Love Me Now"
"Rags to Riches"
"My Funny Valentine"
"Happy Happy Birthday Baby"
"Love Me Now and Forever"
"Cry"
"This Song of Mine"
"I'll Love You Forever"
"I Can't Find the Way"
"A World Without Love"
"Where Is Tomorrow"
"Goodbye My Old Gal"
"Didn't You Say"
"Oh Promise Me"
"I Promise You"
"Your Love"
"Mother Song"
"Two Timer"
"On Your Wedding Day"
"Happy Birthday My Love"
"Now and Forever"
"Dusty Road"
"I'm a Drifter"
"If Ever You're Lonely"
"Sighin' Sighin'"
"Pledging My Love"
"Love Me Espie"
"Matapat na Pag-Ibig" (duet with Nora Aunor)
"Truly"
"Poor Lonely Me"
"Why Must I?"
"I Love You and You Love Me"
"The Music Played"
"Mother of Mine"
"Going Back to Indiana"
"Ben"
"Blueberry Hill"
"A Time for Us"
"Love Is a Beautiful Thing"
"Baby I Love You"
"Sweet Pea"
"I'll Never Love Again"
"Blue Day"
"Be True"
"Forget Me"
"I Can't Believe"
"Why"
"I Am Blue"
"Lost Love"
"Mañanita"
"Buhay Binata"
"Pag-Ibig (The End of the World)"
"Pag-ibig ay Ginhawa"
"Ano Man ang Kasasapitan"
"Sa Langitnong Himaya"
"Sa Pahiyum Mo Lamang"

Awards

References

External links
 
 OPM profile

1944 births
1977 deaths
20th-century Filipino male singers
People from Quezon City
Singers from Metro Manila
ABS-CBN personalities
Radio Philippines Network personalities
20th-century Filipino male actors
Vicor Music artists